Li Aizhen (born May 1936) is a Chinese scientist at the Chinese Academy of Sciences Shanghai Institute of Microsystem and Information Technology. An expert in semiconductor material, she was elected a foreign associate of the United States National Academy of Sciences in 2007.

Biography
Born in Guangbian Village, Yongning Town, Shishi, Fujian Province, Li graduated from Quanzhou First High School in 1954, and entered Fudan University to study chemistry. She started her research career at Shanghai Institute of Metallurgy of CAS—now Shanghai Institute of Microsystem and Information Technology—in 1958. From August 1980 to October 1982, Li was a visiting scholar at department of electronic engineering of Carnegie-Mellon University in the United States. During her stay in the States, she visited Bell Labs and met with Alfred Y. Cho, the "father of molecular beam epitaxy".

On May 1, 2007, Li was elected a foreign associate of the United States National Academy of Sciences (NAS), thus became the first female Chinese scientist to receive this honor. As of 2018 Li has not been admitted into the Chinese Academy of Sciences (CAS), and is the only non-academician from China who has been elected into the NAS as a foreign associate. She is also a recipient of the 2004 Academy of Sciences for the Developing World (TWAS) Prize in Engineering Sciences.

Contributions
Li has made substantial contributions to the development of electronic devices and laser technology.

Honours and awards
2003 Member of the Asia Pacific Academy of Materials (APAM)
2004 Academy of Sciences for the Developing World (TWAS) Prize in Engineering Sciences
May 2007 Foreign associate of the National Academy of Sciences (NAS)

References

1936 births
Chinese women physicists
Living people
People from Shishi, Fujian
Hokkien scientists
Physicists from Fujian
Foreign associates of the National Academy of Sciences
Fudan University alumni
TWAS laureates